Frederick Allan Frank (born October 24, 1950) is an American singer, songwriter, and performer from Peoria, Illinois.

Biography
Frank attended Quincy College (now Quincy University) where he earned his Bachelor of Fine Arts in theater. It was there that he developed an interest in songwriting. Following college, he traveled Europe and formed the short-lived band Deliverance in Hamburg, Germany. After the disbanding of Deliverance, he relocated to Los Angeles where he began working in the Aerospace and Defense industry while still writing songs in his spare time. He retired from the Aerospace industry and began songwriting full-time.

In 2000, Frank won first place for Best Country song in the Unisong International Song Contest. In 2007 he began working his own material, and in 2009 he released his first full-length album entitled The Road So Far on the independent label, Apple Farm Music.

Discography

Albums
 The Road So Far (2009)

References

External links
 Official Website
 MySpace page
 Facebook page

1950 births
Living people
Americana musicians
American male singer-songwriters
Singer-songwriters from Illinois
Writers from Peoria, Illinois
Quincy University alumni
Musicians from Peoria, Illinois